Sahu  is a surname found in India and Pakistan.

There are some people using the surname who belong to the Chasa Khandait caste.

List of people with the surname Sahu (or Sahoo)
 Sahu, Indian farmer and recipient of Padma Shri in 2020 for his contribution in animal husbandry
 Chandra Sekhar Sahu (born 1950), politician and former Member of Parliament representing the Berhampur constituency of Orissa, India
 Chandu Lal Sahu, politician and Member of parliament, Lok Sabha representing Mahasamund, Chhattisgarh
 Kanak Manjari Sahoo (born 1957), writer and translator from Odisha, India
 Kishore Sahu (1915–1980), film actor and director from Madhya Pradesh, India
 Laxminarayan Sahu (1890–1963), writer and politician from Odisha, India
 Nandini Sahu (born 1973), writer and critic in English literature from Odisha, India
 Nattal Sahu (c. 1132), merchant prince who lived during the reign of the Tomara kings near Delhi
 Pardeep Sahu (born 1985), cricketer, Haryana & Kings XI Punjab
 Sarojini Sahoo (born 1956), Feminist writer and a columnist in The New Indian Express, from Odisha, India.
 Sudarshan Sahoo (born 1939), sculptor from Odisha, India
 Sunil Sahu, professor in the Department of Political Science at the DePauw University
 Supriya Sahu (born 1968) Indian Administrative Service, Director General, Doordarshan, President, Asia-Pacific Broadcasting Union
 Tarachand Sahu (1947–2012), politician from Chhattisgarh, India
 Tamradhwaj Sahu (born 1949), politician and former member of the 14th Lok Sabha of India, representing Durg Chhattisgarh

See also
 Shah
 Ghanchi
 Sahu Jain Family

References

Indian surnames